William Alexander Harris may refer to:

William Alexander Harris (Virginia politician) (1805–1864), U.S. Representative from Virginia
William Alexander Harris (Kansas politician), U.S. Representative and Senator from Kansas, and son of William Alexander Harris of Virginia

See also
William Harris (disambiguation)